Jelena Vuković (born 15 February 1975) is a paralympic athlete from Croatia competing mainly in category F42 shot put and discus events.

Vuković has competed in the shot and discus in three Paralympics firstly in 2000, then in 2004 where she won the bronze medal in the discus for F42-46 and then again in 2008. In 2008, she won the seventh place.

References

Paralympic athletes of Croatia
Athletes (track and field) at the 2000 Summer Paralympics
Athletes (track and field) at the 2004 Summer Paralympics
Athletes (track and field) at the 2008 Summer Paralympics
Paralympic bronze medalists for Croatia
Living people
1975 births
Medalists at the 2004 Summer Paralympics
Paralympic medalists in athletics (track and field)
Croatian female discus throwers
Croatian female shot putters
21st-century Croatian women
20th-century Croatian women
Discus throwers with limb difference
Shot putters with limb difference
Paralympic discus throwers
Paralympic shot putters